Raffingora is a small town in the province of Mashonaland West, Zimbabwe. It is located about 45 km north-east of Chinhoyi in one of Zimbabwe's leading tobacco growing districts.

It falls in the Zvimba North Political District and the current Member of Parliament  (2013-2018) is Marian Chombo who is also a cabinet Minister.

References

Populated places in Mashonaland West Province